Goodhue Lutheran Church is a historic church located at Florence in rural Codington County, South Dakota.
The congregation was organized in 1888. The Gothic Revival church was built in 1904. It was added to the National Register in 1996. This is an active  church which is affiliated with the Evangelical Lutheran Church in America.

References

External links
Goodhue Lutheran Church website

Lutheran churches in South Dakota
Churches on the National Register of Historic Places in South Dakota
Gothic Revival church buildings in South Dakota
Churches completed in 1904
Churches in Codington County, South Dakota
National Register of Historic Places in Codington County, South Dakota